Roman Jugg (born 25 July 1957 in Caerphilly, South Wales) is a keyboard player and guitarist. He began his career in the Welsh punk band Victimize in the late 1970s.

An acquaintance of Paul Gray, Jugg was originally hired in late 1981, recording various projects for The Damned, Naz Nomad and the Nightmares and David Vanian and the Phantom Chords. Jugg's alias during his Naz gigs was Sphinx Svenson.

After Captain Sensible left The Damned in 1984, Jugg moved from keyboards to main guitar and became a full member on the studio albums Phantasmagoria (1985) and Anything (1986).

After the 1989 breakup of The Damned he continued to work with Dave Vanian and Bryn Merrick, forming The Phantom Chords. A studio album called David Vanian and the Phantom Chords was released in 1995.

In May 2004, after a nine-year absence, Jugg released a new solo album called Papa Loco.

Personal life

Jugg lives in the Essex town of Leigh-on-Sea.

Jugg plays accordion in an Irish/folk rock band called Dirty Water which he has described as "a good excuse for getting pissed". The group most recently played in Essex at Chinnerys in Southend on 21 December 2019 and will be playing again on St. Patrick's Day 2020.

However, in 2008/2009 Jugg produced and played guitar on the début album of singer-songwriter Andy J Gallagher entitled Helicopter Dolphin Submarine, marking a distinct return to his punk rock roots.

References

1957 births
Living people
The Damned (band) members
Welsh rock guitarists
People from Caerphilly